Bethel-Danebo, most commonly referred to as Bethel, is a neighborhood of west Eugene, Oregon, United States. The neighborhood boundaries are Oregon Route 99 on the east, the former Southern Pacific Coos Bay Line on the south, Green Hill Road on the west and Clear Lake Road on the north.

The neighborhood combines the names of two historic communities. The original location of Bethel is now within the Trainsong neighborhood.
 
Bethel School District is separate from the main Eugene school district.

See also
Irving, Eugene, Oregon
Malabon, Oregon

References

External links
Active Bethel Citizens neighborhood association
 Coordinates for historic community of Bethel
 Coordinates for historic community of Danebo

 

Neighborhoods in Eugene, Oregon